The giant West African snail or banana rasp snail (Archachatina marginata)  is a species of air-breathing tropical land snail, a terrestrial pulmonate gastropod mollusk in the family Achatinidae.

Distribution

This species occurs in Western Africa (Cameroon to the Democratic Republic of the Congo) and the Caribbean (Martinique). How the species reached Martinique is unknown, but they may have been intentionally introduced as "pets" or by workers returning from West Africa.

The natural spread of this species is very slow; however, unintentional spread by individuals for food and as folk medicine is very common. The USDA routinely checks for the species in the luggage of travelers from West Africa, Nigeria particularly, Ghana, and Cameroon.

This species has not yet become established in the United States, but it is considered to represent a potentially serious threat as a pest, an invasive species that could negatively affect agriculture, natural ecosystems, human health, or commerce. Therefore,  this species may be given top national quarantine significance in the United States.

Description 

The snail has a bulbous, large, and broad protoconch, with a white or bluish-white columella, parietal wall, and outer lip. The shell of the snail can grow up to 21 cm in height, and 13 cm in diameter. The shell, when magnified, has the appearance of a woven texture.

Invasive species 
The snail feeds on a variety of plants, including economically important crops such as bananas, lettuce, peanuts, and peas. There are also possible public health ramifications of the spread of the snail as an invasive species: it is a carrier of the parasitic rat lungworm, which causes angiostrongyliasis, which in turn is the most common cause of the eosinophilic meningitis or eosinophilic meningoencephalitis. If the snail continues to spread, it could potentially be a problem for the health of people through parts of North America from Cuba to the United States. However, spreading into North America is limited to southern latitudes, which have a more favorable climate for the snail.

For the above reasons, keeping achatina species as pets in North America is controversial due to invasive spread of similar species into the United States. Subsequently, even Canada has restrictions on import and keep of this species, even though there is no threat of invasive spread due to a climate that would be lethal for escaped individuals.

Ecology 
Achatinids are nocturnal forest dwellers, but can adapt to disturbed habitats. They prefer concealed habitats, and if overcrowding occurs, they may colonize more open habitats. During periods of high humidity, achatinids are more active, but individuals being found during broad daylight are most likely due to high population density.

Eggs of achatinids are normally laid in the soil, but can be found under leaves or rocks. They produce as many as 40 eggs, which are yellow in color with dark blotches, and their incubation period is about 40 days.

Diet 
Snails eat during the day, but they prefer to eat at night. Wild snails are known to eat up to 500 different species of plants. Snails that have become domesticated typically consume food that is high in protein and low in fats. Captive individuals are easily fed with a variety of fruit and vegetables including tomato, lettuce, carrot, cucumber, beans, squash, banana and more. Captive individuals should also be supplemented with a source of calcium and other vitamins (such as is found in reptile turtle pellets, etc.).

Nervous system 
In this organism's nervous system, the two main types of nerves are pallial and visceral. Pallial nerves are the subject of the majority of scientific research. Visceral nerves are split into the main visceral nerve and the rectal visceral nerve. The main visceral nerve is on the snail's back and connects to a large group of nerve cells to transmit information in the body. The rectal visceral nerve starts further down under the main visceral and extends a short length before branching off near the rectum.

Heat can stimulate reactions in the West African snail as a result of the snail's nervous system. The nerves produce warm responsive fibers when the temperature exceeds 25°C and produce cold responsive fibers when the temperature falls below 19°C. The ideal temperature range for this species falls between 13 and 32°C, the thermopreferendum of the species.

Subspecies 
 A. m. var. ovum
 A. m.  var. suturalis
 A. m.  var. egregia
 A. m.  var. eduardi
 A. m.  var. candefacta
 A. m.  var. grevillei
 A. m.  var. icterica

See also
 List of non-marine molluscs of Nigeria

References

External links 

Achatinidae
Gastropods described in 1821